Bay Area Rapid Transit (BART) is a heavy rail rapid transit system in the San Francisco Bay Area in California, United States. BART is administered by the Bay Area Rapid Transit District, a special district government agency formed by Alameda, Contra Costa, and San Francisco counties.

BART has 50 stations: 19 on the surface, 15 elevated, and 16 underground (i.e. subway). 22 stations are in Alameda County, 12 are in Contra Costa, and 8 are in San Francisco. 6 stations are in San Mateo County and 2 are in Santa Clara County; those counties are not part of the BART special district, but contribute to operations funding. ,  has the highest ridership and  has the lowest. Every day before 9 pm, BART trains run on five principal routes; four are transbay routes connecting San Francisco to Oakland and various destinations in the East Bay, while the fifth, the Berryessa/North San José–Richmond line, runs exclusively in the East Bay. Two of the five routes do not run after 9 pm, but all stations remain accessible by transfers via other routes.

The original system was completed in September 1974 when the underwater Transbay Tube and  opened. BART's three routes then were Concord–Daly City, Fremont—Daly City and Richmond–Fremont.  opened as an infill station in 1976, and direct Richmond–Daly City service began operating that year.

A second infill station, opened in 2011. The Coliseum–Oakland International Airport line, and automated guideway transit (AGT) line, opened in 2014 to serve Oakland International Airport.



Services 

BART operates five named and interlined heavy rail services plus one separate automated guideway line. All of the heavy rail services run through Oakland, and all but the Berryessa/North San José–Richmond line run through the Transbay Tube to San Francisco. All five services run until 9 pm; only three services operate evenings after 9 pm, as well as some Sundays during maintenance work. All stations are served during all service hours. The eastern segment of the  line (between Antioch and the transfer platform east of Pittsburg/Bay Point) uses different rolling stock and is separated from the rest of the line.

Unlike most other rapid transit and rail systems around the world, BART lines are not primarily referred to by shorthand designations or their color names (although the colors used on maps have been constant since 1980). The services are mainly identified on maps, schedules, and station signage by the names of their termini. However, the new fleet displays line colors more prominently, and BART has begun to use color names in press releases and GTFS data.

Stations 
BART has 50 passenger stations, of which 47 are high-platform rapid transit stations.  is served by the Oakland Airport Connector, which uses cable-hauled automated guideway transit (AGT) rolling stock;  has separate platforms for rapid transit trains and AGT trains.  and  have low platforms for use with the diesel multiple unit (DMU) trains used on that section of the line.

Nine stations are the terminal of one or more services;  is also a transfer station. Ten stations have connections available to other rail services – Amtrak, Caltrain, Muni Metro, and VTA light rail. All stations are served during all operating hours.

Future stations 

Two additional infill stations–the surface-level  on the Silicon Valley extension and the elevated  on the Oakland Airport Connector–are proposed but not yet funded or scheduled. Several of these future stations connect with other rail services in the South Bay region, including Altamont Corridor Express, which does not yet have a connection with BART.

References

External links 

BART – Stations

Bay Area Rapid Transit
Bay Area Rapid Transit
Bay Area Rapid Transit
BART